Chiquilistlán is a small town in the Mexican state of Jalisco. It is located in the Sierra Tapalpa mountains, at the foot of a hill called Chiquilichi, some 75 kilometres to the south-west of state capital Guadalajara.

Chiquilistlán is a municipal seat, serving as the administrative centre for the surrounding municipality (municipio) of the same name.

Towns in the municipality 
The municipality has 27 towns; the most important ones are: Chiquilistlán (municipal seat), Jalpa (delegation), San José de la Peña, Comala, Cofradía de Jalpa, Los Llanitos, El Agostadero, El Limoncito, Capula, Citala, Almazalte, Limoncito, San Cristóbal, Guamúchil, Milpillas, Moralete, Agua Delgada, El Realito, El Mortero, Churinzio, and La Mora.

Government
The form of government is democratic and depends on Jalisco state government, and federal government. Elections are held every three years, when the municipal president and her/his council are elected.

Municipal presidents

References

Municipalities of Jalisco